Ibragim Gasanbekovich Gasanbekov (25 October 1969 – 3 July 1999) was an Azerbaijani professional football player. He also held Russian citizenship.

Death
He died when the car he was driving collided head-on with a Kamaz truck.

Honours
 Russian Second League top scorer: 30 goals (Zone 1, 1993); 33 goals (Zone West, 1996).

External links
 

1969 births
People from Khasavyurt
1999 deaths
Soviet footballers
Azerbaijani footballers
Azerbaijan international footballers
Azerbaijani expatriate footballers
Road incident deaths in Russia
FC Anzhi Makhachkala players
Association football forwards
Soviet Azerbaijani people
FC Dynamo Makhachkala players